T. John Institute of Technology (TJIT) is a private engineering college located in Bangalore, Karnataka, India. It was established in 2006 by Thomas P John  and is part of T John Group of Institutions. The institute offers undergraduate & postgraduate programmes, and is affiliated to Visvesvaraya Technological University (VTU) and is approved by All India Council for Technical Education (AICTE).

History
T. John Institute of Technology  is part of the T. John Group of Institutions. Since a humble beginning in 1993 the T. John Group has expanded to include new departments and blocks and spread over an area of 20 acres. TJIT was set up in the year 2006. Starting with just two courses B.E. Computer Science Engineering and B.E. Electronics and Communication Engineering, today the college has expanded into a provider of technical education, offering B.E. degrees in six streams of engineering, as well as two post graduate courses.

The Department of Information Science Engineering and the Department of Telecommunication Engineering were established in the year 2007. In the same year the institute also started the Business Administration Department that offers the MBA programme under VTU. In 2009 the first batch of Mechanical Engineering students joined the institute to pursue B.E. in Mechanical Engineering under the newly established Department of Mechanical Engineering. Continuing its growth in 2010, TJIT started the MCA program under VTU.

Departments
 Department of Telecommunication Engineering
 Department of Computer Science Engineering
 Department of Information Science Engineering
 Department of Electronics and Communication Engineering
 Department of Mechanical Engineering
 Department of Civil Engineering
 Department of Humanities and Sciences
 Department of Business Administration
 Department of Computer Application

Facilities and Extracurricular Activities
 Cafeteria
 Digital Library
 Auditorium
 Laboratory 
 Hostel
 Fests
 Sports
 Seminar
 Conference
 Students Chapter

Ranking

References

External links

Further reading
Hacking and cyber forensics workshop organised, The Hindu, 17 March 2013.
Snuvik Tech ties up with T John Institute, The Hindu Businessline, 14 April 2016.

Colleges in Bangalore
Educational institutions established in 2004
2004 establishments in Karnataka